Letter from a Friend is a 1943 short film. It was a trailer to promote the Third War Loan Drive and starred Alan Ladd in his only film after he entered the army. Filming started September 9, 1942.

Plot

References

External links

1943 films
American black-and-white films